The following lists events that happened during 2013 in New Zealand.

Population
National
Estimated populations as at 30 June.
 New Zealand total – 4,442,100
 North Island – 3,398,700 
 South Island – 1,042,800

Main urban areas
Estimated populations as at 30 June.

Auckland – 1,381,800
Christchurch – 369,200
Dunedin – 115,100
Gisborne – 35,200
Hamilton – 214,800
Invercargill – 49,300
Kapiti – 40,700
Napier-Hastings – 127,600
Nelson – 63,300
New Plymouth – 54,800
Palmerston North – 81,500
Rotorua – 55,800
Tauranga – 125,700
Wellington – 389,600
Whanganui – 39,300
Whangārei – 53,600

Incumbents

Regal and vice-regal
Head of State – Elizabeth II
Governor-General – Jerry Mateparae

Government
2013 is the second full year of the 50th Parliament, which first sat on 20 December 2011 and will dissolve on 17 December 2014 if not dissolved prior. The Fifth National Government, first elected in 2008, continues.

Speaker of the House – Lockwood Smith to 31 January, then David Carter
Prime Minister – John Key
Deputy Prime Minister – Bill English
Leader of the House – Gerry Brownlee
Minister of Finance – Bill English
Minister of Foreign Affairs – Murray McCully

Other Party leaders
Labour – David Shearer to 15 September then David Cunliffe
Green  – Russel Norman and Metiria Turei
New Zealand First – Winston Peters
Māori Party – Pita Sharples to 13 July then Te Ururoa Flavell, and Tariana Turia

Judiciary
Chief Justice – Sian Elias

Main centre leaders
Local elections for all city and district councils are held on 12 October.

Mayor of Auckland – Len Brown
Mayor of Tauranga – Stuart Crosby
Mayor of Hamilton – Julie Hardaker
Mayor of Wellington – Celia Wade-Brown
Mayor of Christchurch – Bob Parker to 12 October, then Lianne Dalziel
Mayor of Dunedin – Dave Cull

Arts and literature

Performing arts

Benny Award presented by the Variety Artists Club of New Zealand to Larry Morris.

Events

January

February
 1 February – Callaghan Innovation, a new Crown entity, is launched to replace Industrial Research Limited and parts of the Ministry of Business, Innovation and Employment.

March
 5 March – The 2013 New Zealand census of Population and Dwellings is held, a replacement for the 2011 census that was cancelled after the February 2011 Christchurch earthquake.
 20 March – Popular breakfast spread Marmite returns to supermarket shelves, albeit still in limited supply, ending "Marmageddon". The sole production line had stopped in November 2011 due to earthquake damage at the Christchurch factory, which resulted in stocks running out in March 2012.

April
Police celebrate the second-equal lowest Easter road toll on record – three – second only to 2012's zero.
The Akaroa Marine Reserve is approved by the Minister of Conservation Nick Smith, 17 years after it was initially proposed.
 17 April – The Marriage (Definition of Marriage) Amendment Bill passes its third reading, with New Zealand becoming the thirteenth country worldwide to pass laws legalising same-sex marriage.
 28 April – The South Island completes digital television transition when analogue television signals are switched off at 2:00 am.

May
 20 May – A morning peak commuter train derails on the approach to Wellington railway station, puncturing a hole in a carriage's floor in the process. Four people are injured and thousands of commuters are stranded as the line into the city is blocked.

June
 20–21 June – Wellington is hit by a storm, described to be the worst since the 1968 Wahine storm, with winds reaching 200 km/h. Thousands of homes lose power and part of the Hutt Valley rail line is washed out, causing severe congestion on roads for a week while it is repaired.
 29 June – Meka Whaitiri wins the Ikaroa-Rāwhiti by-election, replacing the late Parekura Horomia.

July
 21 July – A series of earthquakes in Cook Strait, the largest of them 6.5 MW, affect Wellington and the upper South Island.

August
16 August – A 6.6 MW earthquake strikes under Lake Grassmere, Marlborough, affecting Wellington and the upper South Island.
19 August – The Marriage (Definition of Marriage) Amendment Bill came into force, same-sex couples were legally able to marry from this day.
22 August – David Shearer announces his resignation as leader of the Labour Party, fearing he no longer had the full confidence of his caucus.

September
15 September – David Cunliffe is elected leader of the Labour Party.
29 September – The Lower North Island and East Cape complete digital television transition when analogue television signals are switched off at 3:00 am.

October
 7 October – After an appeal to the Privy Council, Mark Lundy's conviction for killing his wife and daughter in August 2000 is quashed and a retrial ordered. 
 12 October – Elections held for all local councils, regional councils and district health boards.

November
 30 November – Poto Williams wins the Christchurch East by-election, replacing Lianne Dalziel and retaining the seat for Labour.

December
 1 December – The Upper North Island becomes the last region to complete digital television transition bringing to an end 53 years of analogue television broadcasts in New Zealand.
 11 December – New Zealand's population reaches 4,500,000, according to Statistics New Zealand estimates.

Holidays and observances
 6 February – Waitangi Day
 25 April – Anzac Day
 3 June – Queen's Birthday Monday
 28 October – Labour Day

Sport

Awards
 Halberg Awards
 Supreme Award – Lydia Ko (golf)
 Sportsman – Scott Dixon (motorsport)
 Sportswoman – Lydia Ko (golf)
 Team – All Blacks (rugby)

Shooting
Ballinger Belt – John Snowden (Ashburton)

Births
 6 February – Geronimo, alpaca
 10 May – Taufaʻahau Manumataongo, son of Crown Prince Tupoutoʻa ʻUlukalala and Princess Sinaitakala Fakafanua of Tonga
 2 October – Gingernuts, Thoroughbred racehorse

Deaths

January
 1 January – Lory Blanchard, rugby league player and coach (born 1924)
 4 January – Guy Henderson, oboist (born 1934)
 10 January – Bob Fenton, politician (born 1923)
 12 January – Helen Brew, actor, birth campaigner, documentary filmmaker, educator and speech therapist (born 1922)
 25 January – Lloyd Phillips, film producer (born 1949)

February
 1 February – Paul Holmes, radio and television broadcaster (born 1950)
 5 February – Tom McGuigan, politician (born 1921)
 10 February – Baron Fielakepa, Tongan noble, politician (born 1961)
 11 February – Tom Aspell, television news producer, foreign correspondent and cameraman (born 1950)
 16 February – Les McNichol, rugby league player (born 1932)
 18 February
 Kevin Black, broadcaster (born 1943)
 Shayle R. Searle, statistician (born 1928)
 24 February – Ralph Hotere, artist (born 1931)
 25 February – Phillip Leishman, broadcaster (born 1951)
 28 February – Mosese Fotuaika, rugby league player (born 1992)

March
 1 March – Sammy Guillen, cricketer (born 1924)
 2 March – Bryce Rope, rugby union coach (born 1923)
 3 March – Johnny Hanks, boxer (born 1934)
 9 March – 
 Geoff Braybrooke, politician (born 1935)
 Anthony Farrant, cricketer (born 1955)
 15 March – Joe Schneider, rower (born 1926)
 18 March – Robin Williams, mathematician, university administrator, public servant (born 1919)
 20 March
 George Lowe, mountaineer, last surviving member of 1953 Everest expedition (born 1924)
 Leslie Milnes, cricketer (born 1922)
 21 March – Sir Ewan Jamieson, armed forces chief (born 1930)
 23 March – Peter Sutton, Anglican clergyman, Bishop of Nelson (1965–90) (born 1923)
 24 March – Barbara Anderson, author (born 1926)
 29 March – Warren Freer, politician (born 1920)
 30 March – Eric Hertz, businessman (born 1954)

April
 15 April – Dave McArtney, rock guitarist (born 1951)
 25 April – Eion Scarrow, gardening expert, television presenter, author (born 1931)
 26 April
 Joseph Churchward, typeface designer (born 1932)
 Farrell Temata, rugby union player and coach (born 1944)
 Tui Uru, broadcaster, singer (born 1926)
 27 April – Rodney Wilson, art historian, museum director (born 1945)
 28 April – Bernie Wood, sports historian, rugby league administrator (born 1939)
 29 April 
 Alex Elisala, rugby league player (born 1992)
 Pablo Etchegoin, physicist (born 1964)
 Parekura Horomia, politician, MP for Ikaroa-Rāwhiti (born 1950)
 30 April – Rata Harrison, rugby league player (born 1935)

May
 15 May – Darrell Tryon, linguist (born 1942)
 16 May – Maurice Marshall, athlete (born 1927)
 19 May – Mirek Smíšek, potter (born 1925)
 21 May – Sir Robert Chambers, jurist (born 1953)
 22 May – Wayne Cottrell, rugby union player (born 1943)
 28 May – John Myles, athlete (born 1926)
 29 May – Dame Margaret Shields, politician (born 1942)

June
 2 June – Bruce Cathie, UFO author and theorist (born 1930)
 4 June – Samani Pulepule, Samoan religious leader (born 1923)
 7 June – Lesley Cantwell, racewalker (born 1987)
 9 June – Noel McMahon, cricketer (born 1916)
 13 June – Maxwell Sparks, air force pilot (born 1920)
 17 June – Michael Baigent, author (born 1948)
 18 June – Hugh Burry, rugby union player, doctor (born 1930)
 20 June – Peter Dignan, rower (born 1955)
 21 June – Dame Barbara Goodman, politician (born 1932)
 27 June – Ian Scott, painter (born 1945)
 28 June – Kenneth Minogue, political theorist (born 1930)

July
 1 July – Maureen Waaka, politician, beauty pageant contestant (born 1942)
 2 July – Richard Campion, theatre director (born 1923)
 11 July – Robin Ferrier, organic chemist (born 1932)
 23 July – Mike Morwood, archaeologist (born 1950)
 24 July – John Morrissey, rugby union player, businessman, philanthropist (born 1939)
 25 July – Barnaby Jack, computer security expert (born 1977)
 27 July – Marty Schmidt, mountaineer (born 1960)

August
 1 August – John Blumsky, broadcaster and journalist (born 1928)
 2 August – Pixie Williams, singer (born 1928)
 5 August – Leonard Watson, cricketer (born 1927)
 7 August – Pat Sheahan, rugby union player, publican (born 1927)
 9 August – John Oakley, cricketer (born 1925)
 17 August – Gus Winckel, World War II pilot (born 1912)
 18 August – Bill Tolhurst, politician (born 1931)
 20 August – Wayne Hodgson, cricketer (born 1959)
 23 August – Henry Maxwell, rugby league player (born 1932)
 27 August – David Stenhouse, evolutionary biologist (born 1932)

September
 8 September – Loo-Chi Hu, marine equipment designer, t'ai chi teacher (born 1924)
 10 September – Mel Cooke, rugby league player (born 1934)
 11 September
 Dave Batten, athlete (born 1926)
 Albert Jones, amateur astronomer (born 1920)
 18 September – Roy McLennan, politician, mayor of Nelson (1971–80) (born 1924)
 19 September – Bob Wallace, test driver, automotive engineer (born 1938)
 27 September – Larry Savage, rugby union player (born 1928)

October
 3 October – Charlie McBride, rugby league player (born 1925)
 15 October – Pat Ryan, boxer (born 1952)
 21 October – Karl Sim, artist and art forger (born 1923)
 23 October – Ted Thorne, naval officer (born 1923)
 25 October
 Ron Ackland, rugby league player and coach (born 1934)
 Paddy McFarlane, association footballer (born 1932)
 Sir William Tyree, electrical engineer, businessman (born 1921)
 27 October – Fred Creba, Paralympic athlete (born 1945)
 31 October – Walter Brown, actor (born 1927)

November
 5 November – Ian Irvine, rugby union player, disability rights advocate (born 1929)
 6 November – Peter Fatialofa, rugby union player and coach (born 1959)
 11 November – William Fyfe, geologist (born 1927)
 15 November – Keith Cumberpatch, field hockey player (born 1927)

December
 2 December – Manny Santos, boxer (born 1941)
 12 December – Agnes Wood, artist, writer (born 1921)
 18 December – Onno Boelee, actor, stuntman, professional wrestler (born 1945)
 19 December – Olive Smuts-Kennedy, politician (born 1925)
 20 December – Barbara Heslop, immunologist (born 1925)
 27 December – Alan Richards, cricketer (born 1922)

See also
List of years in New Zealand
Timeline of New Zealand history
History of New Zealand
Military history of New Zealand
Timeline of the New Zealand environment
Timeline of New Zealand's links with Antarctica

References

 
Years of the 21st century in New Zealand
2010s in New Zealand